A backup dancer also known as background dancer is a performer who dances with or behind the lead performers in a live musical act or in a music video. Their movements (especially where there are many moving together) improve the visual aesthetics of the lead performer, and provide a symmetry and rhythm to accompany the music.

Backup dancers
Some performers began their music careers as backup dancers for other artists, including:

 Lee Know from Stray Kids (for BTS)
Kim Hyo-yeon from Girls' Generation (for BoA)
Yoon Ji-sung and Kang Daniel (for Shihyun and Cao Lu)
Kevin Federline (for Britney Spears, Michael Jackson, Justin Timberlake, Gwen Stefani, Pink, Christina Milian, and LFO)
 FKA twigs
 Cris Judd (for ex-wife Jennifer Lopez' 2001 video "Love Don't Cost a Thing")
 Jennifer Lopez (for the New Kids on the Block, MC Hammer and Janet Jackson's 1993 video "That's the Way Love Goes")
 Rain (for Park Jin-young and Park Ji-yoon)
 Tupac Shakur (for the Digital Underground)
 Michael K. Williams
 Zendaya

Gallery

See also 
 Corps de ballet
 Backing vocalist
 Extra (actor)
 Taxi dancer – a paid dancer in a partner-dance

References

Further reading
 
 
 
 

Dance occupations
Dancer, backup
Filmmaking occupations